Marie-Joseph-Denis Farcot (1798–1875) was a French engineer, inventor and manufacturer, working mainly with steam engines. 
His son, Joseph Farcot, was also a noted inventor.

Early years

Marie-Joseph-Denis Farcot was born in 1798. His father was Joseph Jean Chrysostome Farcot, a former teacher at the college of Juilly, Seine-et-Marne.
He was orphaned at a young age, and became an apprentice with Achille Colas and with Jecker, an expert maker of precision instruments. In 1820 he began work in the studio of Chaillot, where he learned steam engine construction. His training led him to create steam engines that were also precise instruments.

Manufacturer and inventor

In 1823 Farcot established a workshop on the rue Neuve-Sainte-Geneviève. In 1829 he received a bronze medal for two inventions, a variable-speed pump and a pump with two pistons in one body, giving a continuous jet. In 1834 he was awarded a silver medal for an olive oil press.
In 1836 Marie-Joseph Farcot patented the first method of steam distribution that gave almost complete variability to the regulator.
In 1839 he had transferred his workshop to the rue Moreau, and that year received another silver medal for an innovative steam engine with variable power.

In 1846 he transferred his metallurgical factory to Saint-Ouen, Seine-Saint-Denis, where he purchased land covering . 
The factory was accessible by railway branches from the north and the west. It mainly produced steam engines, but also made boilers, pumps and other products. 
The factory employed 145 workers in 1849, and 500 to 700 between 1872 and 1902.
Marie-Joseph Farcot worked with his son, Jean Joseph Léon Farcot, who obtained many patents for mechanical engineering inventions, notably the servomechanism.
Their company was called Farcot and Son.

In 1854 Marie-Joseph Farcot was awarded patents for two ways to modify Watt's governor so as to eliminate offset.
In 1857 Marie-Joseph Farcot  proposed a number of improvements to steam hammer design, including an arrangement so the steam acted from above, increasing the striking force, improved valve arrangements and the use of springs and material to absorb the shock and prevent breakage.
He and his son Jean Joseph obtained another governor patent in 1862, and in 1864 a patent for a spring-loaded governor.

Notes

Sources

1798 births
1875 deaths
19th-century French engineers
19th-century French inventors